Route 33 is a state highway in the central part of the US state of New Jersey. The highway extends , from an intersection with U.S. Route 1 (US 1) in Trenton, Mercer County, east to an intersection with Route 71 in Neptune, Monmouth County. Route 33 is a major route through central New Jersey, as it runs from the greater state capital area in the Delaware Valley region, through a mixture of farmland, housing, and commercial developments in the lower Raritan Valley region, en route to the greater Asbury Park area on the Jersey Shore. The route traverses through historic towns such as Hightstown, Monroe, Manalapan, Freehold, and Tinton Falls. There are several intersections on Route 33 with future developments.

Route 33 begins in Trenton on a two-lane road. It passes through central Mercer County, joining northbound US 130 in Robbinsville. It leaves the U.S. highway in East Windsor and becomes a local town road into the borough of Hightstown. It turns east again as it passes the east end of the Hightstown Bypass, where it becomes a divided arterial with four lanes as it makes its way through Monmouth County toward the shore. Around the greater "Freeholds area", it becomes a freeway. It then crosses the Garden State Parkway's Exit 100 in Tinton Falls and Route 18 in Neptune. Here, it is locally known as Corlies Avenue. Route 33 ends at Route 71 in Neptune. It has two concurrencies along the route, one with Route 34 and the second with US 130.

Route description

Route 33 begins at an interchange with the Trenton Freeway (US 1) in the state capital of Trenton, Mercer County; the interchange also includes a ramp from westbound Route 33 to southbound Route 129 at that route's northern terminus at a partial interchange with US 1. The route heads southeast on Market Street as a four-lane divided highway, passing over NJ Transit's River Line and Amtrak's Northeast Corridor railroad line, just south of the Trenton Transit Center serving Amtrak, NJ Transit's Northeast Corridor Line and River Line, and SEPTA's Trenton Line. After intersecting Clinton Avenue, Route 33 becomes Greenwood Avenue and heads east as a two-lane road through residential neighborhoods on the east side of the city, passing north of Trenton Central High School and serving a few small businesses. Greenwood Avenue then enters Hamilton Township and enters a slightly more commercialized area before passing north of a cemetery. At this point, Greenwood Avenue ends, and Route 33 merges with Nottingham Way and becomes a four-lane boulevard lined with many homes and businesses. After reaching a modified interchange with Interstate 295 (I-295), Route 33 turns right off of Nottingham Way and becomes a two-lane road with a center left-turn lane. The route passes many business and crosses through a wooded residential area before coming back into a commercial area and entering Robbinsville Township, where Route 33 turns northeast onto US 130 and the two routes run concurrently on a four-lane divided highway.

Route 33 and US 130 pass through a wooded area with several business lining the route before entering East Windsor Township, where Route 33 splits off of US 130 onto the two-lane Mercer Street. The road passes through woods before emerging into Hightstown, where it serves several businesses and bisects a cemetery before entering the downtown area. Here, Mercer Street ends, and Route 33 runs northeast along Main Street before turning right onto Franklin Street and coming back into East Windsor Township. The route widens to four lanes as it passes under the New Jersey Turnpike (I-95) and becomes a divided highway, reaching an interchange with the Route 133 freeway, which serves the turnpike.

After the intersection with Twin Rivers Drive, Route 33 enters Monroe Township, Middlesex County, where it serves many residential communities. Continuing east, activity along the sides of the highway disappears, and the route enters Millstone Township, Monmouth County, where businesses begin to reappear. Crossing into Manalapan Township, Route 33 passes through a mix of farmland and commercial areas before reaching the western terminus of Route 33 Business, an old alignment of Route 33. At this point, Route 33 becomes a freeway known as the Freehold Bypass, and enters Freehold Township. The freeway passes south of Freehold Raceway Mall and bypasses Freehold Borough, reaching interchanges with County Route 537 (CR 537) and US 9 at the southern terminus of Route 79. Heading into more rural areas, Route 33 enters Howell Township and passes over the Freehold Industrial Track railroad line operated by the Delaware and Raritan River Railroad before it meets the eastern terminus of Route 33 Business as the freeway ends.

Now a two-lane road, Route 33 passes through a largely wooded area south of Naval Weapons Station Earle and serves several businesses and residential neighborhoods before merging with Route 34 and becoming a four-lane divided highway. The two routes run concurrently and pass over the Southern Secondary railroad line operated by the Delaware and Raritan River Railroad before entering Wall Township, where several businesses line the route. At Collingwood Circle, Route 34 splits from Route 33, and the latter continues east as a four-lane undivided highway and enters Tinton Falls. The westbound and eastbound lanes eventually split apart as the highway reaches the western terminus of Route 66 and an interchange with the Garden State Parkway. Past this point, Route 33 becomes Corlies Avenue and enters Neptune Township, passing through many residential neighborhoods. After an interchange with the Route 18 freeway, Route 33 forms the border between Neptune Township to the north and Neptune City to the south. The road then crosses entirely back into Neptune Township and passes south of Jersey Shore University Medical Center and K. Hovnanian Children's Hospital. After an intersection with Route 35, Route 33 narrows to a two-lane road with a center left-turn lane before crossing NJ Transit's North Jersey Coast Line and reaching its eastern terminus at Route 71.

History

West of Robbinsville, the road was maintained by the Trenton and Allentown Turnpike, which was chartered in 1856; east of Robbinsville, the turnpike followed modern-day County Route 526 to Allentown. From the border of Manalapan and Millstone townships east to the intersection with Woodward Road, the road was maintained by the Manalapan and Patton's Corner Turnpike; the road from there to Freehold was maintained as the Freehold and Manalapan Turnpike, chartered in 1858. The Freehold and Manalapan bought the portion of the Manalapan and Patton's Corner now signed Route 33. In addition, a small portion of the Englishtown and Millstone Turnpike was built along Route 33 from County Route 527A west to Millstone Road, though this was overtaken in the construction of the Freehold and Manalapan Turnpike, chartered in 1866 to connect Freehold and Manalapan. From Freehold to Jerseyville, Route 33 Business was maintained by the Freehold and Jerseyville Turnpike, chartered in 1866.

Route 33 originally was part of two auto trails: the Cranbury Trail, an alternative to the Lincoln Trail running from New Brunswick to Trenton; and the Jersey Link, running from Hightstown to Ocean Grove. These routes were incorporated in 1916 into two new routes: New Jersey Route 1 in parts of the road south of Hightstown, and Route 7 from Hightstown to its terminus at Route 71. Both roads were changed into Route 33 in the 1927 New Jersey state highway renumbering.

Route 33 was originally planned as a freeway from U.S. Route 1 in Trenton across New Jersey to Route 18 in Neptune.  However, in 1967, the NJDOT scaled back proposals to the current seven-mile (11 km) Freehold Bypass.  The bypass from near County Route 527 in Manalapan to Halls Mills Road in Freehold was completed and opened in segments from 1971 to 1988; however, the remainder of the bypass east to Fairfield Road in Howell was not completed until 2003. The project cost $33.7 million in 2003 USD.

The Route 33 bypass has three abandoned segments. The first of these is the cloverleaf ramp from Route 79 southbound to the Route 33 freeway eastbound. It has been mostly destroyed, to make way for a new reverse jughandle for U.S. Route 9 northbound to Schanck Road.  The merging part of the ramp still remains abandoned along the right side of the eastbound freeway.

The original alignment for the freeway east of Halls Mills Road (CR 55) can be seen now as an NJDOT maintenance shed.  The new alignment curves to the left after the interchange, in order to avoid what the NJDOT believed to be a suspected (but never identified) turtle bog habitat.  The pavement is accessible from the eastbound on-ramp, but is fenced off.

Howell Road was never given access from Route 33 eastbound and thus the ramp still remains barricaded off, slowly decaying.

Up until late 1988, Route 33 westbound ran underneath US 130, then merged with 130's southbound lanes. This was because Route 33 ran parallel to Pennsylvania Railroad (PRR) Camden & Amboy route at that point, requiring a massive concrete overpass. (Route 33 eastbound also ascended the bridge approach about halfway before branching off like an exit ramp—a sign with flashing lights read "Hightstown, Shore Points" at the fork.) PRR abandoned the Hightstown–Windsor segment in 1967, reducing the importance of the hulking bridge. NJDOT eventually demolished the crumbling structure in 1989, with its approaches flattened to grade. Route 33 now meets US 130 at the north end of the multiplex with a traffic signal.

A similar bridge carried Route 33 over the same PRR (now Conrail Shared Assets Operations [CSAO]) line further south in Robbinsville. NJDOT replaced the overpass with a wider, linear roadway in 2009. As the CSAO line was dormant, no railroad street crossing was installed. Trackage was dismantled two years later in 2011 in between Robbinsville and Windsor.

In 2001, the Freehold Bypass was designated as the Theodore J. Narozanick Highway.

Until 2003, the 33/130 junction in Robbinsville was configured as an at-grade wye interchange, employing curved ramps for the directional movements.  The junction has since been modified to a signalized intersection with ordinary turning lanes.  It has also been converted from a T-intersection to a 4-way, with the construction of a new road on the southeast side of US-130.

On December 31, 2006, the New Jersey Turnpike Authority released its proposals regarding Interchange 8 on the New Jersey Turnpike. The old Interchange 8 was to be demolished and replaced with a new interchange. The new Exit 8 would end at the intersection with Route 33, Milford Road, and the 133 bypass (on the east side of the expressway, instead of the west). This new Exit 8 would grant direct access to the bypass (without going through any traffic lights), as well as to 33, using grade-separated interchanges. The new toll gate was to feature a total of 10 lanes at the new facility. The new interchange opened in January 2013.

Major intersections

Business route

Route 33 Business is a short state highway in New Jersey that is the original alignment of Route 33 before a freeway was built as a bypass of Freehold. This business route stretches  through Manalapan Township, Freehold Township, Freehold Borough and Howell Township. The highway holds the distinction of being the only business route state highway in all of New Jersey.

Route 33 Business begins at the interchange with Route 33, its parent route, in Manalapan Township, New Jersey. A short distance after, the interchange from Route 33 eastbound merges into Route 33 Business, and the route passes to the south of Monmouth Battlefield State Park and enters Freehold Township. Soon after entering the borough of Freehold, Route 33 Business interchanges with U.S. Route 9. Route 33 Business turns to the southeast, passing to the north of Freehold Raceway. A short distance later, Route 33 Business intersects at a traffic light with New Jersey Route 79 (South Street) in downtown Freehold. Farther east, the route passes over the Freehold Industrial Track railroad line operated by the Delaware and Raritan River Railroad. At the intersection with Fairfield Road, Route 33 Business enters the interchange with Route 33 and the freeway, where the designation terminates.

Route 33 Business originates as an alignment of Route 33, designated across the state in the 1927 New Jersey state highway renumbering as a replacement to Routes 1 and 7, which were assigned in the 1920s. The route remained intact for several decades, continuing as the proposals for the crosstown Route 33 Freeway during the 1960s were drawn up. The freeway would continue, interchanging with the Garden State Parkway near Exit 100 in Neptune and terminate at the Route 18 freeway in Neptune. However, the next year, the New Jersey Department of Transportation had to scale down the project to a new bypass of Freehold, and prevent the congestion of traffic through the borough. Design studies began that year, and the entire bypass was constructed during the 70s and 80s, with most of the freeway finished in 1988. This new bypass was designated as Route 33 Bypass from 1965 until Route 33 was re-aligned off the local roads onto the new freeway in 1990, which at that time, Route 33 Business was designated on the former alignment.

Major intersections

Related routes
Route 133

See also

References

External links

An expanded view of road jurisdiction in Trenton at the confluence of US 1, US 206, NJ 29, NJ 33 and NJ 129
Photos of Route 33 by Gribblenation.net
Steve Alpert's NJ 33 Page

033
Two-lane freeways in the United States
Transportation in Mercer County, New Jersey
Transportation in Middlesex County, New Jersey
Transportation in Monmouth County, New Jersey
Limited-access roads in New Jersey